is a Japanese geographical term.  It means both an ancient division of the country and the main road running through it.  It is part of the Gokishichidō system.  It was situated along the central mountains of northern Honshu, specifically the Tōhoku region.

The Tōsandō region encompasses eight ancient provinces.
Ōmi Province
Mino Province
Hida Province
Shinano Province
Kōzuke Province
Shimotsuke Province
Mutsu Province
Dewa Province

After 711 AD, Tōsandō was understood to include the Musashi province.

See also 
 Comparison of past and present administrative divisions of Japan
 Nakasendō (post-Sekigahara Tōsandō)
 Sanriku, neighbouring region

Notes

References
 Nussbaum, Louis-Frédéric and Käthe Roth. (2005).  Japan encyclopedia. Cambridge: Harvard University Press. ;  OCLC 58053128
 Titsingh, Isaac. (1834).  Annales des empereurs du Japon (Nihon Odai Ichiran).  Paris: Royal Asiatic Society, Oriental Translation Fund of Great Britain and Ireland. OCLC 5850691

Regions of Japan
Tosando